The 2003 DFB-Pokal Final decided the winner of the 2002–03 DFB-Pokal, the 60th season of Germany's premier knockout football cup competition. It was played on 31 May 2003 at the Olympiastadion in Berlin. Bayern Munich won the match 3–1 against 1. FC Kaiserslautern to claim their 11th cup title.

Route to the final
The DFB-Pokal began with 64 teams in a single-elimination knockout cup competition. There were a total of five rounds leading up to the final. Teams were drawn against each other, and the winner after 90 minutes would advance. If still tied, 30 minutes of extra time was played. If the score was still level, a penalty shoot-out was used to determine the winner.

Note: In all results below, the score of the finalist is given first (H: home; A: away).

Match

Details

References

External links
 Match report at kicker.de 
 Match report at WorldFootball.net
 Match report at Fussballdaten.de 

FC Bayern Munich matches
1. FC Kaiserslautern matches
2002–03 in German football cups
2003
May 2003 sports events in Europe
2003 in Berlin
Football competitions in Berlin